Linariantha is a monotypic genus in the plant family Acanthaceae. It was described by Brian Laurence Burtt and Rosemary Margaret Smith.

The sole species is Linariantha bicolor, also described by Burtt and Smith. No subspecies are listed in the Catalog of Life.

References

Acanthaceae genera
Acanthaceae
Taxa named by Rosemary Margaret Smith
Monotypic Lamiales genera